(1529–1601) was a Japanese samurai of the Sengoku period. He was the 15th generation head of the Soma clan, and a key figure in the fighting that took place in northern Japan, especially with the Date clan. Father of Soma Yōshitane.

External links
Extensive data on Moritane and the Soma clan

1529 births
1601 deaths
Samurai
Daimyo